The 2017 in Indian sports was held across the Indian cities all through the season.

Events

International events 
 2–8 January – Chennai Open scheduled in Chennai.
 24–29 January – Syed Modi International Grand Prix Gold scheduled in Lucknow.
 16–19 February – India Open Squash is scheduled in New Delhi.
 19–26 February – India participated in 2017 Asian Winter Games.
 28 March – 2 April – India Super Series was held in New Delhi.
 10–14 May – 2017 Asian Wrestling Championship held in New Delhi, India.
 6–9 July – 2017 Asian Athletics Championship held in Bhubaneswar.
 27 August – India beat Nepal by 2–1 in final of 2017 SAFF under −15 championship.
 6–28 October – FIFA U-17 World Cup is scheduled. England wins the maiden title by beating Spain in final by 5–2.
 22 October – India beat Malaysia by 2–1 in final of 2017 men's Hockey Asia Cup held in Dhaka, Bangladesh.
 22 October – Srikant Kidambi wins 2017 Denmark Super Series Premier. 
 5 October – India won 2017 Hockey women's Asia cup held in Japan by beating China in final by 5–4 (1–1). 
 1 November – Indian cricket team registered their first T20I win against New Zealand at New Delhi
 30 November – Mirabai Chanu wins gold in 2017 world weightlifting championship held in USA.
 1–10 December – The 2016–17 Men's FIH Hockey World League Final took place in Bhubaneswar, India. India won bronze medal.

Sports Leagues in 2017

Domestic leagues

Multi-sport events

References

2017 in Indian sport